Lac-Tremblant-Nord is a small village and municipality in the Laurentides region of Quebec, Canada, part of the Les Laurentides Regional County Municipality. Its territory surrounds the northern portion of Lake Tremblant, includes Bibite Lake, and extends to Gervais Lake. The village is located on the south shore of the Lake Tremblant, a few kilometres west of the Mont Tremblant Resort.

Permanent inhabitants of Lac-Tremblant-Nord are few, but its population increases greatly during summer and winter holidays.

History
The municipality was formed in 1915 out of the territory of Labelle by its residents who were determined to join in order to protect the territory.

Lac-Tremblant-Nord was among the 4 municipalities that were regrouped to form the new Town of Mont-Tremblant on November 22, 2000. But it was reinstated as a municipality on January 1, 2006.

Demographics

Population
Population trend:

Private dwellings occupied by usual residents: 31 (total dwellings: 70)

Mother tongue:
 English as first language: 25%
 French as first language: 83.3%
 English and French as first language: 0%
 Other as first language: 0%

References

Incorporated places in Laurentides
Municipalities in Quebec